Frederick Albert Blackham (6 April 1873 – 31 January 1967) was an Australian rules footballer who played with Melbourne in the Victorian Football League (VFL). His brother, Jack Blackham, played Test cricket for Australia.

Notes

External links 

1873 births
1967 deaths
Australian rules footballers from Melbourne
Melbourne Football Club players
Brighton Football Club players
People from North Melbourne